Brodowo may refer to the following places:
Brodowo, Greater Poland Voivodeship (west-central Poland)
Brodowo, Masovian Voivodeship (east-central Poland)
Brodowo, Podlaskie Voivodeship (north-east Poland)
Brodowo, Działdowo County in Warmian-Masurian Voivodeship (north Poland)
Brodowo, Ełk County in Warmian-Masurian Voivodeship (north Poland)